Scars on Broadway is the debut studio album by Scars on Broadway, a band consisting of System of a Down members Daron Malakian and John Dolmayan. The album contains 15 tracks, all written by Malakian.

The album opened at No. 17 on the Billboard 200 with 24,000 copies. As of April 2010, the album has sold 83,000 copies in the US.

Background
Following System of a Down's hiatus in May 2006, guitarist Daron Malakian announced his new project — Scars on Broadway — a band which would include System of a Down drummer John Dolmayan and himself. Malakian and Dolmayan experimented with different musicians, for a period of nine months in 2007 the band took form and forged its sound in intense rehearsals and recording sessions under Malakian's direction, at his home studio and Sunset Sound; with musicians Danny Shamoun on keyboards, Dominic Cifarelli on bass, and Franky Perez on guitar and backing vocals. The band begin recording their debut album in September 2007.

On what direction his album will take, Daron Malakian states: "It will probably be something very heavy mixed in with traditional Armenian and thrash, death, doom, black and dark metal influences. When, or even if, the music comes out, it will still be structured, just like System of a Down's music is." Malakian stated the sound will be influenced by classic rock such as David Bowie, Brian Eno, Yes, Neil Young, and Roxy Music, shifting his songwriting away from System of a Down's "frazzled metal" to more "song-based" work. "I don't feel we're the mosh-pit band," said Malakian. "That's just where I'm comfortable as a writer right now."

On May 2, 2008, the album was announced. A week later, the band was signed to Interscope Records.

The band released "They Say" as their first airplay single on March 28. The music video for the track was released on June 27. A second single, "World Long Gone", was released on September 8, featured a music video directed by filmmaker Joel Schumacher.

Reception

Reviews for the album were generally positive, with the album holding a score of 73/100 on Metacritic. However, several reviewers were critical of the lyrics. The BBC's Al Fox gave the album a negative review, stating "It's tough to write a review so overwhelmingly negative in response to somebody's heartfelt outpourings but this kind of old-school rock is tired, worn out, and has as little relevance to today's world as a classical string quartet playing the millionth version of a 300-year-old concerto." Similarly, Consequence of Sound gave the album a "D" rating, stating "Scars On Broadway is most definitely worth hearing – if you're a die-hard fan of Malakian's vocals. It's sadly an overall novelty work, with lyrics that unfortunately toe the line of absolute absurdity in some cases".

Rolling Stone, in a 3.5 out of 5 review, stating "as Scars on Broadway, Malakian shaves System's punk-dervish and metallic-vengeance extremes into straight-on rock glazed with New Wave keyboards and impish-angel harmonies. It is a cleverly barbed normality." AllMusic, also giving the album 3.5 out of 5 stars, praised the album's instrumentals but criticized the lyrics. Billboard.com's Gary Graff stated of the album

Track listing

Personnel
Scars on Broadway
 Daron Malakian – vocals, guitars, bass guitar, keyboards, organ, mellotron, production
 John Dolmayan – drums
 Franky Perez – guitars, backing vocals
 Danny Shamoun – keyboards, piano, percussion

Production
 Dave Schiffman – engineering
 John Silas Cranfield – additional engineering, editing
 Ryan Williams – mixing
 Eddy Schreyer – mastering
 Vartan Malakian – artwork
 Sandra Cand – artwork
 Brandy Flower – package design

Charts

References

2008 debut albums
Interscope Records albums
Daron Malakian and Scars on Broadway albums
Albums produced by Daron Malakian